K Pandu Vivekanand Goud is an Indian politician who belonged to the TDP but now Telangana Rashtra Samithi. He is an MLA from the Quthbullapur constituency of Medchal-Malkajgiri district in Telangana state. In the 2014 state assembly elections, he defeated K Hanmanth Reddy of TRS by a margin of 39,024 votes. In 2018 general elections he won with a majority of 40,000 plus votes on Congress candidate Kuna Srisailam Goud.

Childhood 

K P Vivekananda was born to Late K.M. Pandu and K. Shyamala. His father K. M. Pandu served as Sarpanch two times and was first Chairman of Quthbullapur Municipality. He resides in Quthbullapur, about 100 meters away from government school.

Education 

He did his schooling from  H M T High School, HMT Colony, Near Chintal. He completed his B.Eng. from Muffakham Jah College of Engineering and Technology affiliated to Osmania University.

Political Journey 

As he was connected to politics, which came from his father, he always wanted to serve the people and so he started a Shakthi Yuva Seva Samithi after completing his BE and entered active politics in the year 2000.

He contested from TRS in 2009 in Quthbullapur constituency but lost to an independent candidate Kuna Srisailam Goud. Kuna Srisailam Goud however later entered into YSRC and then now in INC party. However, after losing the elections, the young leader has always lived in the public as the savior for all. Therefore, KP Vivekananda became famous as young, dynamic, smart and educated leader.

KP Vivekananda contested from Telugu Desam Party (TDP) and was elected as an M. L. A. on 14 May 2014 from Quthbullapur Constituency which gave him the way into Telangana State Assembly and within no time span he emerged as a youth icon with zeal and enthusiasm to serve the people. K.P. Vivekananda joined the Telangana Rashtra Samithi (TRS) in the presence of Chief Minister K. Chandrasekhar Rao on  9 February 2016.

Vivekananda contested the 2018 Assembly elections as TRS candidate and won by a margin of 41,500 votes.

Rules Committee member 

More important is that the way he presented himself in a well mannered and disciplined way in the Assembly, which got him good name and he was appointed Rules Committee member in the Telangana State Assembly.

US Young Leaders Political Program 

Shri K. P. Vivekananda  was one among the five and only from the Telangana State to represent India in the U.S. Young Leaders Political Program which was held in US. He is growing as a good leader day-by-day and the manner in which he is dealing with public issues is very commendable. He has a great vision to strive for political, social, cultural and economic development of common people which attracts people towards him.

Adarsh Yuva Vidhayak Puraskar 

His well mannered educated behavior was recognized by the Bharathiya Chatra Sansad, Pune and he was awarded the Adarsh Yuva Vidhayak Puraskar for the year 2014 which is a matter of pride for Telangana State. This award was presented by the Hon’ble Speaker of Uttharakand State Legislative Assembly.

Public Life:

Shri Vivekananda both as the leader and an MLA has a name that he works for the betterment of Quthbullapur Constituency all the time and carrying out various programs/activities for the empowerment of women and youth to build a strong society which earned him good name among the people.

References

External links 
 Official website

Telugu Desam Party politicians
Telangana MLAs 2014–2018
1977 births
Living people
Telangana MLAs 2018–2023